Little Ellingham is a village and civil parish in the English county of Norfolk. The nearest railway station is at Attleborough for the Breckland Line which runs between Cambridge and Norwich. The nearest airport is Norwich International Airport.

Little Ellingham is served by St Peter's Church in the Benefice of Great Ellingham.

History
The villages name means 'Homestead/village of Ella's people' or possibly, 'homestead/village at Ella's place'.

Little Ellingham has an entry in the Domesday Book of 1085. In the great book, Little Ellingham is recorded by the names “Ailincham”, “Elincgham” and “Ellingham. The main landholder is the King but in the custody of William de Warenne and Godric. The survey also mentions 12 cattle and 34 goats.

Historic buildings
Located to the northwest of the church is Little Ellingham hall and its associated clock tower, both built in 1855. The brick tower, which stands at the centre of a group of cottages, is three stories high with a cupola on the top. 

To the rear of the clock tower are the Hall farm buildings, now not presently in use, with their massive roofs.

References

http://kepn.nottingham.ac.uk/map/place/Norfolk/Little%20Ellingham

Villages in Norfolk
Civil parishes in Norfolk
Breckland District